Matt Ruth (born December 1945 in Ballyragget, County Kilkenny) is an Irish former sportsperson.  He played hurling and Gaelic football at various times with his local club Old Christians, Commercials and St Patrick's and was a member of the Limerick and Kilkenny senior inter-county teams from 1973 until 1983.  Ruth's son, Matthew, played minor hurling with Kilkenny in 2008.

References

1945 births
Living people
Dual players
Old Christians hurlers
Commercials (Limerick) Gaelic footballers
Kilkenny Gaelic footballers
Kilkenny inter-county hurlers
Limerick inter-county hurlers
All-Ireland Senior Hurling Championship winners